Jack Lawrence Granatstein  (May 21, 1939) is a Canadian historian who specializes in Canadian political and military history.

Education
Born on May 21, 1939, in Toronto, Ontario, into a Jewish family, Granatstein received a graduation diploma from Royal Military College Saint-Jean in 1959, his Bachelor of Arts degree from the Royal Military College of Canada in 1961, his Master of Arts degree from the University of Toronto in 1962, and his Doctor of Philosophy degree from Duke University in 1966.

Career
Granatstein served in the Canadian Army from 1956 to 1966. He then taught at York University until 1996 where he is Distinguished Research Professor of History Emeritus.

Granatstein is an outspoken defender of traditional narrative history in lectures, books, print, and broadcast media. Perhaps his best known work is Who Killed Canadian History?, which expressed his alarm at the widespread ignorance of history among students, and the distortions he complained were perpetrated by a new generation of social historians. He wrote of an ideological war waged inside university history departments:

Granatstein is the author of over sixty other books, including Yankee Go Home?, Who Killed The Canadian Military?, and Victory 1945 (with Desmond Morton). The Generals won the J.W. Dafoe Prize and the UBC Medal for Canadian Biography. The Last Good War was awarded the Canadian Authors Association's 2005 Lela Common Award for Canadian History.

Granatstein was a member of the RMC Board of Governors and is Chair of the Council for Canadian Security in the 21st Century.

Granatstein has also been involved in television coverage of political and military events. On June 6, 1994, he was part of the CBC's coverage of the 50th anniversary of D-Day, as the network's chief correspondent, Peter Mansbridge got expert help in the commentary from Granatstein. Granatstein helped Mansbridge again on May 8, 1995, during the CBC's coverage of the 50th anniversary of VE Day. He reprised the same role on the 60th and 65th anniversaries of D-Day and V-E Day.

Granatstein served as the head of the Canadian War Museum in Ottawa from 1998 to 2001 and was a driving force behind the building of the museum's new home that opened in 2005. He currently sits on the Advisory Council and is a Distinguished Research Fellow at the Canadian Defence and Foreign Affairs Institute.

Honours

The Royal Society of Canada awarded him the J. B. Tyrrell Historical Medal (1992) for "outstanding work in the history of Canada". In 1996, the Conference of Defence Associations Institute named him winner of the Vimy Award.

In 1996, he became an Officer of the Order of Canada, and he won the National History Society's Pierre Berton Prize in 2004 and the Organization for the History of Canada's National History Award in 2006. He has received honorary degrees from the University of Western Ontario, the University of Calgary, as well as Memorial University of Newfoundland, McMaster University, Niagara University, and Ryerson University.

He was awarded the C.P. Stacey Prize, in collaboration with Dean Oliver, in 2011 for their  The Oxford Companion to Canadian Military History.

Family
Jack Granatstein is a descendant of Mendel Granatstein, a Polish Jew, who emigrated to Toronto in 1880 where he became a successful business owner in the junk and later textile industry. He became the first Jew to own a home (1895 at 42 St. George Street since demolished) in Toronto.

Bibliography
 Best Little Army in the World (2015) HarperCollins, preview from Google Books 
 Canada's Army: Waging War and Keeping the Peace (2002) overview of Canadian military history
 Second Edition published 2011 with several new chapters about both Afghanistan and the effect of increased federal funding.
 Who Killed Canadian History? (1998) argues that national history has become too splintered for the nation's good; online
 Whose War Is It? (2007) critique of Canadian foreign policy and defense
 Who Killed the Canadian Military? (2004) critique of the Canadian military
 Canada's War: The Politics of the Mackenzie King Government, 1939-1945 political maneuvers of the King government during World War II online
 The Ottawa Men: The Civil Service Mandarins, 1935-1957 (1982) Oxford University Press examines the development of the federal civil service and its contribution to Canada's coming of age as a nation. online
 reissued (2015) The Ottawa Men by Rock's Mills Press, with a new introduction surveying research since 1982, and more photographs.
 Mackenzie King (1975), for secondary students  online

See also
 List of Canadian historians
 Military history of Canada

References

Further reading
 Jack Granatstein, 'a driving force'" Beaver (Feb/Mar 2005), Vol. 85, Issue 1
 Palmer, Bryan D. "Of silences and trenches: A dissident view of Granatstein's meaning." Canadian Historical Review 80.4 (1999): 676-686. online

External links
 Order of Canada citation, a Governor General's Award
 Jack Granatstein from The Canadian Encyclopedia
  online copies of his books

1939 births
Living people
Military personnel from Toronto
Canadian curators
Canadian military historians
Canadian male non-fiction writers
Canadian people of Polish-Jewish descent
Duke University alumni
Fellows of the Royal Society of Canada
Jewish Canadian writers
Officers of the Order of Canada
Writers from Toronto
University of Toronto alumni
Royal Military College of Canada alumni
Academic staff of York University
Historians of Canada
Royal Military College Saint-Jean alumni
20th-century Canadian male writers
20th-century Canadian historians
21st-century Canadian historians
Conservatism in Canada
Jewish historians
Critics of multiculturalism